Ibirá is a municipality in the state of São Paulo, Brazil. The population is 12,518 (2020 est.) in an area of 190 km². Ibirá is known as a tourist resort, due to the thermal waters.

Neighboring municipalities
Potirendaba
Cedral
Uchoa
Catanduva
Catiguá
Elisiário
Urupês

Geography

The municipality of Ibirá is situated in the northern part of São Paulo state. Its main river is the Rio do Cubatão, a tributary of the Tietê River.

Demographics

Transportation
SP-310 Highway Washington Luís
SP-379 Rodovia Roberto Mario Perosa

Notable people
Heleieth Saffioti (1934 - 2010), sociologist, teacher and feminist activist

References

External links
  http://www.ibira.sp.gov.br Prefecture of Ibirá
  Ibirá on citybrazil.com.br 

Municipalities in São Paulo (state)